Phobay Kutu-Akoi (born 3 December 1987 in Monrovia, Liberia) is a Liberian athlete who competes in sprinting events. She represented her country in the 100 metres at the 2012 Summer Olympics. She was the flag bearer of Liberia during the opening ceremony. She also competed at the 2011 Outdoor World Championships in Daegu, South Korea and at the 2016 Indoor World Championships in Portland, Oregon.

Competition record

1Did not start in the final

2Did not start in the semifinals

Personal bests
Outdoor
100 metres – 11.37 (+2.0 m/s, San Marcos 2012)
200 metres – 23.89 (-0.2 m/s, Porto Novo 2012)
Indoor
60 metres – 7.41 (Norman 2012)

References 

1987 births
Living people
Sportspeople from Monrovia
Liberian female sprinters
Olympic athletes of Liberia
Athletes (track and field) at the 2012 Summer Olympics
Olympic female sprinters